Richard Arkwright (1732–1792)  was an English inventor and entrepreneur during the early Industrial Revolution 

Richard Arkwright may also refer to:
 Richard Arkwright junior (1755–1843), son of the inventor
 Richard Arkwright (1781–1832), grandson of the inventor, MP for Rye 1813–18 and 1826–30
 Richard Arkwright (barrister) (1835–1918), barrister and Conservative politician, MP for Leominster 1866–76
 A painting by Joseph Wright of Derby of the inventor

See also 
 Arkwright